The Montel Williams Show (also known as Montel) is an American syndicated tabloid talk show, hosted by Montel Williams, which ran from 1991 to 2008.

On January 30, 2008, the end of production of new episodes of The Montel Williams Show at the end of the 2007–2008 television season was announced. A rerun package offered by Montels distributor, CBS Television Distribution, was sold into syndication for the 2008–2009 season, and reruns also aired on Black Entertainment Television (BET).

History
The series premiered July 8, 1991, with a thirteen week trial run in select American markets. Based on its initial performance, the program entered national syndication beginning with its 14th broadcast week. In its early years, Montel was similar to most tabloid talk shows especially The Jerry Springer Show. As time went on, however, the genre became less popular, and toward the end of the show's run, Montel usually focused on inspirational stories and less controversial subjects. Common themes seen on Montel include finding lost loves, reuniting mothers who gave their children up for adoption, or stories of strong women who faced certain danger (such as rape or attempted murder) and fought their way out. Multiple sclerosis was also a frequent topic, as Williams suffers from the disease.

Most Wednesdays (and sometimes on Fridays as well during the summer), self-proclaimed psychic Sylvia Browne was Montel's guest, and performed psychic readings of guests as well as discussing her ideas about spirituality and the afterlife. Her predictions have been the target for much criticism, and her psychic abilities explained as cold reading by critics such as Robert S. Lancaster. She refused to partake in the One Million Dollar Paranormal Challenge from James Randi, a prominent skeptic.

During its final week on the air, Montel's television talk show aired a series of clip shows known as "Finale Week" looking back on the show's past 17 seasons, including past guests and Sylvia Browne's past appearances on the show.

Production and distribution
The series was produced by Mountain Movers for its entire run, with Out of My Way Productions co-producing on its first four seasons and then Letnom Productions for the following two seasons. The first three seasons were distributed by Viacom Enterprises. After Viacom's purchase of Paramount Pictures in March 1994, Viacom Enterprises was merged into Paramount Television's distribution arm, Paramount Domestic Television. PDT began distributing the show in fall 1994, and became CBS Paramount Domestic Television after the Viacom/CBS Corporation split in 2006. Its distributor changed names once again in 2007, as CPDT was merged with King World Productions to form the current distributor, CBS Television Distribution.

Montel originated from Television City in Hollywood, California for its first season. For season two, the show moved to Unitel Video's studio space on West 53rd Street in New York City, where it remained for the rest of its run.

Cancellation and further developments
It was reported in Variety that CBS TV Distribution terminated the show when key Fox-owned stations chose not to renew it for the 2008–2009 season. The final episode aired in most markets on May 16, 2008, with some markets airing it at a later date (one week later).

In June 2008, Ofcom of the UK ruled that ITV2 (which aired the show during its run) "breached standards with a repeat of the Montel Williams Show in which a 'desperate' couple were told by self-professed psychic Sylvia Browne that their missing son, Shawn Hornbeck was dead - even though he turned up alive the previous year." The ruling concerned "breaching rule 2.1 of the Broadcasting Code, which relates to protecting viewers against offensive material."

References

External links

 

1991 American television series debuts
2008 American television series endings
1990s American television talk shows
2000s American television talk shows
First-run syndicated television programs in the United States
Television series by CBS Studios
English-language television shows